Playmates is the fourth studio album, and the first during their reunion, by English rock band the Small Faces. The album was created by Steve Marriott, Ian McLagan, Kenney Jones and Rick Wills when they reformed in the late seventies and recorded it along with the album 78 in the Shade. Ronnie Lane left before the album was recorded.

Reunion: 1975–1978
Following the break-up of Faces in 1975, the original Small Faces line-up reformed briefly to film videos miming to the reissued "Itchycoo Park", which hit the charts again. The group tried recording together again but Lane left after the first rehearsal due to an argument. Unbeknownst to the others, he was just beginning to show the symptoms of multiple sclerosis, and his behaviour was misinterpreted by Marriott and the others as a drunken tantrum. Lane subsequently began recording Rough Mix with the Who's Pete Townshend shortly after the argument.

Nevertheless, McLagan, Jones and Marriott decided to stay together as Small Faces, recruiting ex-Peter Frampton and Roxy Music bassist Rick Wills to take Lane's place. This iteration of Small Faces recorded two albums: Playmates (1977) and 78 in the Shade (1978), released on Atlantic Records. Both albums were later reissued on Wounded Bird Records. Guitarist Jimmy McCulloch also briefly joined this line-up after leaving Wings. When McCulloch phoned Paul McCartney, who had found him increasingly difficult to work with, to announce he was joining Marriott, McCartney reportedly said "I was a little put out at first, but, well, what can you say to that?" McCulloch's tenure with the band lasted only for a few months in late 1977. He recorded only one album, 78 in the Shade in 1978 with the band. Unfortunately for the band, mainstream music in Britain was rapidly changing direction, punk rock having been established around this time. The reunion albums, as a result, were both critical and commercial failures. Small Faces broke up again in 1978.

Track listing

In popular culture 
 The Beatles drummer Ringo Starr covered the song "Tonight" for his studio album Bad Boy in 1978.

Personnel 
Small Faces
Steve Marriott – guitar, harmonica, vocals
Ian McLagan – keyboards, vocals
Rick Wills – bass guitar, vocals
Kenney Jones – drums, vocals
with:
 Dave Hynes - backing vocals 
 Greg Ridley - backing vocals
 P.P. Arnold - backing vocals
 Vicky Brown - backing vocals
 Joe Brown - mandolin, acoustic guitar, backing vocals
 Mel Collins - saxophone

References

 Guests : https://www.discogs.com/fr/Small-Faces-Playmates/release/2991325

1977 albums
Small Faces albums
Atlantic Records albums
albums produced by Shel Talmy